Georgian Extended is a Unicode block containing Georgian Mtavruli ("title" or "heading") letters that function as uppercase versions of their Mkhedruli counterparts in the Georgian block. Unlike all other casing scripts in Unicode, there is no title casing between Mkhedruli and Mtavruli letters, because Mtavruli is typically used only in all-caps text, although there have been some historical attempts at capitalization.

Block

History
The following Unicode-related documents record the purpose and process of defining specific characters in the Georgian Extended block:

References 

Unicode blocks